State Route 374 (SR 374) is a  rural state highway located entirely in Seminole County in the southwestern part of the U.S. state of Georgia. The roadway was built in the early 1960s and was designated as SR 374 in 1972.

Route description
SR 374 begins at an intersection with SR 253 north of Lake Seminole and travels to the north and curves to the northwest.

SR 374 is not part of the National Highway System, a system of roadways important to the nation's economy, defense, and mobility.

History
The roadway that would eventually become SR 374 was built between 1960 and 1963 on nearly exactly the same alignment as the current one. In 1972, the roadway was extended southward to the northern shore of Lake Seminole and the entire roadway was designated as SR 374. In 1997, the segment south of SR 253 was removed from the state highway system.

Major intersections

See also

References

External links

 Georgia Roads (Routes 361 - 380)

374
Transportation in Seminole County, Georgia